Dehik (also Romanized as Dehīk; also known as Dehak) is a village in Daman Kuh Rural District, in the Central District of Esfarayen County, North Khorasan Province, Iran. At the 2006 census, its population was 263, in 53 families.

References 

Populated places in Esfarayen County